The 2011–12 Melbourne Renegades season was the inaugural in the club's history. Coached by Simon Helmot and captained by Andrew McDonald, they competed in the BBL's 2011–12 season.

Summary
The Renegades' foundation captain was Victorian all-rounder Andrew McDonald and coached by then Victorian Bushrangers one-day coach, Simon Helmot. In their first season, the Renegade signed local state players such as Aaron Finch, Glenn Maxwell, Brad Hodge and Dirk Nannes, along with Pakistani imports Shahid Afridi and Abdul Razzaq. The Renegades struggled in their first season, only winning two games against the Sydney Thunder and the Sydney Sixers irrespectively. Aaron Finch scored 259 runs, whilst Shahid Afridi took 10 wickets.

Fixtures

Regular season

Ladder

Ladder progress

Squad information
The following is the Renegades men squad for the 2011–12 Big Bash League season.

Season statistics

Home attendance

References

External links
 Official website of the Melbourne Renegades
 Official website of the Big Bash League

Melbourne Renegades seasons